Iranican is an Iranian American non-profit multimedia organization. Currently, Iranican publishes a weekly talk show, Sedaye Iranican, formerly Iranican Live on  Iranican website  and on Radio Javan every Wednesday. Iranican also occasionally publishes videos as Iranican Reports.

The name
The term "Iranican" was first introduced by one of the hosts. This term was widely coined by Siamack Baniameri's book The Iranican Dream published in 2005. Iranican is a derivative of the two words "Iranian" and "American", however because in Persian, "Irani" means Iranian, it also carries the meaning of Irani[an] can.

History
Iranican was pioneered as a talk show by eight Iranians in the California Bay Area in their early 20s on Saturday October 8, 2005.  Later on, the TV show was polished and developed and officially launched as Iranican on February 11, 2006. From October 8, 2005 with original co-hosts were Ali Ebrahimi, Samira Kashani, Iman Oskoorouchi, Shobeir Shobeiri, Shadi Sharif, Salman Roknizadeh, and Shadi Vaezzadeh till December 23, 2006; Iranican aired on Saturdays from 11AM-Noon PST on Persian News Network. A day or two later, PNN was cut off Telestar5 satellite, however Iranican continued airing its shows live online directly from its website for a few weeks. PNN has not come back since, but Iranican was picked up by another Satellite Channel, Markazi TV. The first Iranican show on Markazi aired live on July 29, 2007. A few months later Markazi went off Satellite for 2 months to switch frequency while Iranican started to make short online reports and has continued to do so since. On May 21, 2008, Iranican re-launched its discussion formatted talk shows as a radio program named Iranican Live which airs on RadioJavan.

Launch
The official launch on February 11, 2006 featured Maz Jobrani, an Iranian American Comedian  and Ahmad Ahmad, an Egyptian American Comedian .  This launch was the first Iranican show to feature a live audience in the studio and since then, Iranican has not had another show with a live audience.

Interview
| Yas
| Tm Bax
| Mehrnoosh
| Andranik Madadian
| Shahbal Shabpareh
| Reza Madadi
| Ashkan Khatibi
| Sogand
| Mahan Moin
| Khashayar
| Abjeez
| Erfan Hajrasuliha
| Ajam
| Mohammad Bibak
| Siavash Shams
| Sami Beigi
| Taham
| Sogand

External links
 Iranican

American television talk shows
Iranian culture